is a Japanese basketball player for Chanson V-Magic and the Japanese national team.

She participated at the 2017 FIBA Women's Asia Cup.

References

1994 births
Living people
Japanese women's basketball players
Sportspeople from Aichi Prefecture
Power forwards (basketball)
Basketball players at the 2018 Asian Games
Asian Games bronze medalists for Japan
Asian Games medalists in basketball
Medalists at the 2018 Asian Games